The Rocket Ball was one of the earliest forms of metallic cartridge for firearms, containing bullet and powder in a single, metal-cased unit.

Construction
The Rocket Ball, patented in 1848 by Walter Hunt, consisted of a lead bullet with a deep hollow in the rear, running a majority of the length of the cartridge.  The hollow, like that of the Minie ball, served to seal the bullet into the bore, but Rocket Ball put the cavity to further use.  By packing the deep cavity with powder, and sealing it with a cap with a small hole in the rear for ignition, the Rocket Ball replaced the earlier paper cartridge with a durable package capable of being fed from a magazine.  The cap was blown out of the bore upon firing.  The Rocket Ball was used in magazine fed lever action guns, allowing the first easily manufactured repeating single chamber firearms.

Use
While the Rocket Ball provided the means of making practical repeating firearms, it was not an ideal solution.  The limited volume in the base of the bullet severely limited the amount of powder that could be used, and thus limited the potential velocity and range of the cartridge. With muzzle energy of only about 56 foot-pounds (76 joules), the Rocket Ball was less powerful than even the most feeble of modern "pocket pistol" cartridges, such as .25 ACP.

Despite these limitations, the Rocket Ball was used in a number of attempts at making a commercially successful firearm, culminating in the Volcanic Repeating Arms Company.  The Volcanic cartridge went one step further, adding a primer to the cap of the Rocket Ball, making the ammunition completely self-contained.

See also
 Minie ball
 Caseless ammunition

References

External links
 Early Caseless Ammo: The Rocket Ball
 Colette Gravity Pistol (which have used Rocket Ball ammunition)

Ammunition